Bayt Tima was a Palestinian Arab village in the Gaza Subdistrict, located  northeast of Gaza and some  from the coastline. It was situated in flat terrain on the southern coastal plain of Palestine. Bayt Tima was depopulated during the 1948 Arab-Israeli War. Its population in 1945 was 1,060.

History
During the  Mandate period  the village was inspected by the Department of Antiquities, and a number of ancient remains were noted, in addition to two Arabic inscriptions built into the mosque. In the cemetery located just south of Bayt Tima lies a worn mosaic pavement, suggesting an Ancient Roman or Byzantine presence at the site.

A 14th-century Mamluk-era mosque existed on the site dedicated to a certain prophet or local saint named "Nabi Tima". In the courtyard of the mosque and near it are imitations of Corinthian capitals and columns of gray stone. The remainder of the building was built in local kurkar stone. There is no mention of Bayt Tima in early Arabic sources and the inscription on the mosque is the only Mamluk association to it.

Ottoman era
Bayt Tima came under Ottoman rule in the early 16th century, and in the 1596 tax records it was under the administration of the nahiya of Gaza, part of the Liwa of Gaza, with a population of 126 Muslim households, an estimated 693 persons. The inhabitants paid a fixed tax rate of 33,3% on a number of crops, including wheat, barley, fruit, almonds, sesame, beehives, and goats; a total of 21,200 akçe.   Pierre Jacotin named  the village Gergieh on his map from 1799.

In 1838, Beit Tima was noted as a Muslim village in the Gaza area.

The Ottomans constructed additions to the mosque, and the Egyptians under Muhammad Ali of Egypt reconstructed it in the 1830s. 
In 1863 the French explorer Victor Guérin visited Bayt Tima, noting that it had a population of 400 and mentioning the Mamluk mosque.

An Ottoman village list of about 1870 indicated 49 houses and a population of 159, though  the population count included men, only.

In 1883, the PEF's Survey of Western Palestine described it as being of moderate-size, with two pools and shrines, and two small patches of garden nearby.

British Mandate era
In the 1922 census of Palestine conducted by the British Mandate authorities, Bait Tima had a population of 606  Muslims, increasing by the 1931 census to 762, still all Muslim, in 157 houses.

In the 1945 statistics  the population of Beit Tima consisted of 1060, all Muslims,  and the  land area was 11,032  dunams, according to an official land and population survey. Of this, 197 dunams were designated  for plantations and irrigable land, 10,444 for cereals, while 60 dunams were built-up areas.

During the British Mandate period, Bayt Tima had its own shops, the 14th-century mosque, and an elementary school built in 1946. It shared the school with nearby Hulayqat and Kawkaba. Its adobe  houses—which amounted to 157—were grouped together in blocks, separated by streets or open space; the largest block was at the center of the village. Most residents worked in rainfed agriculture, cultivating grain, vegetables, and fruits, especially figs, apricots, and almonds.

1948 War and aftermath
According to the Jaffa-based newspaper Filastin, a "Zionist attempt" to infiltrate Bayt Tima was recorded as early as February 1948, preceding the outbreak of the 1948 Arab-Israeli War. Their forces were driven back by a "hail of bullets" from the local militiamen which lasted for half an hour.

On 30/31 May the Negev Brigade reported that they had conquered Bayt Tima, killing some 20 Arabs and destroying the  well and a granary. Morris notes that it  was later reconquered by the Egyptian army, to finally falling to the Israelis in October.

Israeli sources had told the Associated Press that they had occupied Bayt Tima at the beginning of June. They claimed it was captured while "slashing behind an Egyptian coastal spearhead" on June 1. But the occupation was short-lived, since Israeli forces also threatened Bayt Tima a month later, according to Egyptian writer Muhammad Abd al-Munim. He writes that at the end of the first truce, in early July, the village was held by Palestinian militiamen and Israeli forces encroached on Bayt Tima, occupying the hills overlooking it. Its defenders were reinforced by a Saudi Arabian company fighting on the southern front and Bayt Tima supposedly remained in Arab hands throughout the second truce.

An aerial and artillery bombardment against the village in mid-October 1948 led to the flight of a large number of refugees from Bayt Tima. It was occupied on October 18–19 in the early stages of Operation Yoav by the Givati Brigade. The New York Times quoted an Israeli communique on October 20 which said that Bayt Tima had fallen, along with Hulayqat and Kawkaba.

Following the war the area was incorporated into the State of Israel, but the village's land remained undeveloped. According to Palestinian historian Walid Khalidi, "Sycamore and carob trees grow around the rubble on the site. The land is used for agriculture".

References

Bibliography

External links
 Welcome to Bayt Tima,
 Bayt Tima,   Zochrot
Survey of Western Palestine, Map 20:   IAA, Wikimedia commons 
Bayt Tima from the Khalil Sakakini Cultural Center
 H. Bayt Tima, dr. Khalidi

District of Gaza
Arab villages depopulated during the 1948 Arab–Israeli War